Hassoum Ceesay  (born 1971) is a Gambian historian, writer and museum curator at the Gambia National Museum. He is one of the most prolific Gambian historians.

Life
Hassoum Ceesay attended Armitage High School, and Fourah Bay College, University of Sierra Leone. He continued to Canada's Saint Mary's University, in the Nova Scotia capital of Halifax, where he gained a Bachelor of Arts in history in 1999. He was the features editor at The Daily Observer newspaper in Banjul and editorial writer from 1999 to 2006. He was curator of The Gambia National Museum from 1999 to 2008, curating numerous art and ethnography exhibitions. He gained a Post Graduate Diploma in Museum Studies from the University of Nairobi, Kenya, in 2003. From January 2008 to August 2008 he was Deputy Permanent Secretary and Director of the Press Office for President Jammeh. In 2009 he gained a MA in African History from the University of the Gambia. In 2010 he was Lead Researcher on a UNESCO study of cultural rights in the Gambia. He was Director of the Copyright Office, The Gambia. Hassoum is currently Director General, National Centre for Arts and Culture, Banjul, The Gambia and is  credited for the establishment of the newly created Copyright Collecting Society of The Gambia. From 2014 to 2017, he served as Member University of The Gambia Governing Council.

Hassoum Ceesay is a well-known face on Gambian television, where he frequently speaks on history topics and issues.

Works

Books
Gambian Women: an Introductory History, Fulladu Publishers, Banjul 2007. 135 pages. First, Second, Third and Fourth editions.
(Co-author) Ceremonies of The Gambia, 2004, 100 pages
Gambian Women: Profiles and Historical Notes, Fulladu Publishers, 2011, 120 pages.
(Co-editor) A Guide to Historic Sites and Monuments: Sites of The Gambia, Fulladu Publishers, 2012. 
Patriots: profiles of eminent Gambians, Global Hands Publishing, Leicester, UK, 2016.
 (ed. with Pierre Gomez) A Geocritical Representation of Banjul (Bathurst): 1816-2016, Global Hands Publishing, 2018.
Founding Father: P.S Njie, a moral biography, Gambia National Museum Books, 2018: http://thepoint.gm/africa/gambia/article/hassoum-ceesay-founding-father-ps-njie-a-moral-biography-baobab-printers-203-pages-2018 Reviewed in Roundtable Journal of Commonwealth Institute,  https://www.tandfonline.com/loi/ctrt20

Encyclopedic contributions
‘Dr Florence Mahoney’; ‘Fatou Khan’; ‘Louise N'Jie’; Sally Njie’; ‘Fatou Bensouda’ in Dictionary of African Biography, edited by Henry Louis Gates Jr. and Emmanuel K. Akyeampong, Oxford University Press, 2011.
'Ada Beigh'; 'Hannah Mahoney'; 'Wilfred Davidson Carrol'; 'Matarr Ceesay'; 'Mama Tamba Jammeh'; John Colley Faye'; 'Cecelia Mary Ruth Cole'; 'Momodou Musa Njie'; 'Kemintang'; 'Marion Foon'; 'Maryann Gabbidon'; in Oxford African American Studies Centre: The Online authority on the African American Experience.

Articles and book chapters
 'Conservation at the Katchikally Crocodile Pool', Africa 2009 Bulletin, 2001
 'A character construction of Gabriel Roberts' Trial of Busumbala in New Ndaanan, University of The Gambia Journal, January 2009, p. 26-29
 'Noegletek es tarsadami fejlodes Bathurstben, Gambia 1925–1965' (Hungarian) (Women and Social Development in Bathurst, Gambia 1925–1965) in AFRIKA TANULMANYOK, 2011 V. P.98-111, Journal of Hungarian African Studies.
 'Wild Oysters, Female harvesters, and Mangrove Forests of The Gambia' in Abdoulaye Saine et al., eds., State and Society in The Gambia, Africa World Press, 2012.
 'Chief and Protectorate Administration in The Gambia: 1894-1965' in Baba G. Jallow, ed., Leadership in Colonial Africa, Palgrave-Macmillan, 2014.
 'The Impact of the Crises on Institutions in Guinea Bissau and the Sub-Region’ in Patrick Chabal and Toby Green, eds.,  Guinea Bissau: from micro state to 'narco-state' , Oxford University Press, and Hurst, London, 2015
 'Small But Activist: The Gambia and West African Diplomacy, 1965-2015, Tarikh, Journal of the Historical Society of Nigeria, Ibadan University, Vol. 11, No. 1, 2018, pp17-37.
 'Razing Africa: Combating Criminal Consortia in the logging sector’, enact, 2018, pp 1-32. Researcher/Consultant See: https://enact-africa.s3.amazonaws.com/site/uploads/2018-09-20-research-paper-06-logging.pdf
 'Chiefs and the Management of Urbanization in Colonial Bathurst, Gambia 1939-1960', Journal of Mande Studies, (Indiana University Press) Vol.18, 2017.
 Review of Jeggan Senghor, 'The Reverend John Colley Faye. A biography, AuthorHouse, in SOAS Bulletin, (Cambridge University Press)London, February 2016.
 Review of David Perfect, Historical Dictionary of The Gambia (fifth edition), Rowman & Littlefield, 2016 in Journal of Global South Studies, (University of Florida Press), Fall 2016.https://muse.jhu.edu/article/659147
 Review of Gendered Voices in Gambian Literature, Pierre Gomez & Isatou Gomez, Global Hands Publishing, Leicester, UK in Research In African Literatures, (Indiana University Press) Vol. 47, No 4 Winter 2017.https://muse.jhu.edu/article/648529
 'Pierre Sarr N’jie(1909-1993)' in Jeggan Senghor, ed., Profiles of Gambian Political Leaders in the Decolonization Era, pp. 146-218, Global Hands Publishing, Leicester, UK, 2017.
 'Gambia, The,’ in Linda L. Lowry, ed., The SAGE International Encyclopedia of Travel and Tourism, pp. 504-505, 2017, http://sk.sagepub.com
Hassoum Ceesay, Review of Assan Sarr, Islam, Power, and Dependency in the Gambia River Basin: the politics of land control, 1790–1940. Rochester NY: University of Rochester Press (hb US$49.95 – 978 1 58046 569 4). 2016, 224 pp, Africa: Journal of the International African Institute, Cambridge University Press, Vol.89, No. 2 May 2019. https://www.cambridge.org/core/journals/africa/article/assan-sarr-islam-power-and-dependency-in-the-gambia-river-basin-the-politics-of-land-control-17901940-rochester-ny-university-of-rochester.

Hassoum Ceesay, ‘Help us Balance Our Budget’: Chiefs as Economic Agents in Colonial Gambia, 1900-1950, African Economic History Journal, Volume 47, Number 2, 2019, University of Wisconsin Press,

Hassoum Ceesay, ‘Women’s Associations and Social Development in Bathurst 1925–1965’ in Grasian Mkodzongi and Mariama Khan(eds.) Africa: History and Culture, Kendall Hunt Publishing, New York, 2020, pages 29-49’.  https://he.kendallhunt.com/product/africa-history-and-culture.
Hassoum Ceesay. FATOO KHAN, THE COLONIAL COMMISSIONER'S MISTRESS: AN AMOROUS RELATIONSHIP IN COLONIAL GAMBIA’,  IGWEBUIKE: An African Journal of Arts and Humanities. Vol. 6. No. 2. ISSN 2488-9210 (Print) 2504-9038 (Online) 2020.  Department of Philosophy and Religious Studies, Tansian University. . https://www.igwebuikeresearchinstitute.org/igwebuikejournals.php
 Hassoum Ceesay, 'Henry Anthony Madi (1913-1965): A Forgotten Gambian Nationalist' in Ibadan Journal of Humanistics Studies,'' Vol.30, 2020, Faculty of Arts, Ibadan University Press, pages 52-67.
Book Reviews and Conference Papers

Review of: Sarah J. Zimmerman. 2020. Military Marriage: West African
Soldiers’ Conjugal Traditions in Modern French Empire. Athens: Ohio
University Press. 301 pp.
https://asq.africa.ufl.edu/wp-content/uploads/sites/168/br_v21i2.pdf#page=24
African Studies Journal, Vol. 21, Issue 2(August 2022), pp.98-100.

Convener: Digital Data Literacy Empowerment: Competence Models for
Digital Data Literacy in Africa and Digital Repositories as Open
Educational Resources, University of Education in Winneba (UEW),
Ghana. In collaboration with the University of Winneba and Point Sud
(Bamako), 3-7 October 2022.

Conference Paper Presented: CODESRIA/Nordic African Institute Workshop
on “Generation Exodus? Youth mobility politics and radical change in
West Africa”. Dakar, Senegal, 8-9 December, 2022 'Stowaways’ Stories:
Gambian Youth in Irregular Migration, 1950-1955'.

Paper Presented: 'The Gambia’s Role In the PAIGC Independence Struggle
in Guinea Bissau, 1963-1974', International symposium "Amilcar Cabral:
fifty years later", January, 19 to 21, 2023, Assane Seck University of
Ziguinchor, Senegal.

References 

1971 births
Living people
Gambian writers
Historians of Africa
Gambian curators
Gambian academics
University of Sierra Leone alumni